Xanthe Terra is a large area on Mars, centered just north of the Martian equator.
1867.65 km. Its name means "golden-yellow land."  It is in the Lunae Palus quadrangle, the Coprates quadrangle,  the Margaritifer Sinus quadrangle, and the Oxia Palus quadrangle.

Ravi Vallis,  Aromatum Chaos, Ophir, Ganges Chasma, Nanedi Valles, Shalbatana Vallis, Orson Welles Crater, Mutch Crater, and  Da Vinci Crater are some major features in Xanthe Terra.

Images from Mars Express, Mars Global Surveyor, and the Mars Reconnaissance Orbiter have revealed ancient river valleys and deltas. The deltas show many thin layers just as deltas on Earth. Scientists speculate that features in Xanthe Terra show evidence of precipitation on early Mars.

References

External links
 - the MOC photo took it far above Xanthe Terra

Terrae on Mars
Lunae Palus quadrangle
Coprates quadrangle
Margaritifer Sinus quadrangle
Oxia Palus quadrangle